Sint-Elisabeth Hospital was the main hospital on Curaçao, located in the Otrobanda district of Willemstad.  A new hospital, Hospital Nobo Otrobanda, to be called the Curaçao Medical Center was built as its replacement. Part of the existing hospital will be demolished. The contract for construction was led and managed by Stichting Ontwikkeling Nederlandse Antillen (Foundation for the Development of the Netherlands Antilles).  The costs of running the hospital will be higher because it will have more staff (about 1260) and have to meet management costs and depreciation which it did not do before. The Sint-Elisabeth Hospital closed in November 2019, and was replaced by the Curaçao Medical Center.

Facilities
The hospital has a decompression chamber and qualified staff to assist scuba divers suffering from decompression sickness.  There is a kidney dialysis unit.

There are 500 beds.

History
The first nursing home on the site, St. Elisabeth Gasthuis, was founded on 3 December 1855 by Monseigneur Ferdinand Eduard Cornelis Kieckens.

References 

Buildings and structures in Willemstad
Hospitals in Curaçao
1855 establishments in the Dutch Empire
Hospitals established in 1855
19th-century architecture in the Netherlands